Calumet Air Force Station is a closed United States Air Force General Surveillance Radar station. It was closed in 1988 by the Air Force, and turned over to the Federal Aviation Administration (FAA).

The property was purchased by Open Skies Project, LLC in 2021.  The Open Skies Project is a group of friends and family who purchased the former Calumet Air Force Station with the goal of restoring the property and making it a site that is accessible to the entire public.  For more information, please visit www.openskiesproject.org.

History 
In late 1951 Air Defense Command selected the Keweenaw, Michigan site as one of twenty-eight radar stations built as part of the second segment of the permanent radar surveillance network. Prompted by the start of the Korean War, on July 11, 1950, the Secretary of the Air Force asked the Secretary of Defense for approval to expedite construction of the second segment of the permanent network. Receiving the Defense Secretary's approval on July 21, the Air Force directed the Corps of Engineers to proceed with construction.

On 1 May 1951 the 665th Aircraft Control and Warning Squadron began operating AN/FPS-3 and AN/FPS-5 radars at this northern Michigan site in early 1953, and initially the station functioned as a Ground-Control Intercept (GCI) and warning station.  As a GCI station, the squadron's role was to guide interceptor aircraft toward unidentified intruders picked up on the unit's radar scopes. On 1 December 1953 the site was re-designated as Calumet Air Force Station.

In 1956 an AN/FPS-6 replaced the AN/FPS-5 height-finder radar. In 1958 an AN/FPS-20 search radar was deployed at Calumet. By 1961 this radar was upgraded and redesignated as an AN/FPS-64. During 1960 Calumet AFS joined the Semi Automatic Ground Environment (SAGE) system, feeding data to DC-14 at K. I. Sawyer AFB, Michigan. After joining, the squadron was re-designated as the 665th Radar Squadron (SAGE) on  15 July 1960. The radar squadron provided information 24/7 the SAGE Direction Center where it was analyzed to determine range, direction altitude speed and whether or not aircraft were friendly or hostile.  On 31 July 1963, the site was redesignated as the NORAD ID Z-16.

A turn-over of equipment in 1963 left the site with an AN/FPS-27 search radar along with AN/FPS-26A and AN/FPS-90 height-finder radars. The AN/FPS-90 was removed in the late 1970s.

In addition to the main facility, Calumet operated the following AN/FPS-18 Gap Filler sites:
 Painesdale, MI (P-16A) 
 Upson, WI (P-16B) 

The 665th Radar Sq was inactivated and replaced by the 665th Air Defense Group in March 1970. The upgrade to group status was done because of Calumet AFS' status as a Backup Interceptor Control (BUIC) site. BUIC sites were alternate control sites in the event that SAGE Direction Centers became disabled and unable to control interceptor aircraft. The group was inactivated and replaced by the 655th Radar Squadron as defenses against manned bombers were reduced. The group was disbanded in 1984.

Over the years, the equipment at the station was upgraded or modified to improve the efficiency and accuracy of the information gathered by the radars.  Calumet came under Tactical Air Command jurisdiction in October 1979 with the inactivation of Aerospace Defense Command and the formation of ADTAC. The station then underwent cease-operations about that time, and the AN/FPS-26A height-finder radar was removed, but the site closing was soon reversed (Allegedly due to Calumet AFS being the only station to pick up a simulated air incursion).  On 30 September 1988, the site finally closed permanently. Calumet was then reconfigured as an Air Force Joint Surveillance System (JSS) site, initially with only the AN/FPS-27. An AN/MPS-11 Search Radar was installed as a gap-filler during the decommissioning of the AN/FPS-27 and the commissioning of the AN/FPS-91A.  An AN/FPS-91A replaced the AN/FPS-27, and later an AN/FPS-116 height-finder radar was installed.

After closure in 1988 ownership of the station was transferred to Keweenaw County, with a portion being used by the Keweenaw Academy reform school, with some facilities being used for cellular, amateur and other radio communications.  As with many other closed bases, some of the facilities have become degraded due to lack of use and maintenance. In August 2021 a group of Michigan Technological University alumni purchased the facility and surrounding land with plans to remediate environmental issues and development into a tourist destination.

Air Force units and assignments

Units
 665th Radar Squadron
 Constituted as the 665th Aircraft Control and Warning Squadron
 Activated on 27 November 1950
 Redesignated 665th Radar Squadron (SAGE) on 15 July 1960
 Inactivated on 1 March 1970
 Redesignated 665th Radar Squadron on 1 January 1974
 Activated on 17 January 1974
 Inactivated on 30 September 1988

 665th Air Defense Group
 Constituted as the 665th Air Defense Group on 13 February 1970
 Activated on 1 March 1970
 Inactivated on 17 January 1974
 Disbanded on 27 September 1984

Commanders
 Major Ira E. Mason 1962?–1963
 Major Fred L. McPherson 1963–1965
 Major Roger W. Gottschall 1965–?
 Major David P. Lentz, 1 March 1970 – 1970
 Maj. James H. Bentley, 1970–unknown
 Col. John Morgan Fear 1971–
 Maj David Hershberger 1979–1981
 Capt/Maj Jeff Mogilewicz 1981–1983
 Lt Col Larry Dobbs, 1983–1985
 Lt Col Scott Meyer, 1985–1987 – The men and women of the base earned the Outstanding Unit Award during this time.
 Lt Col Michael Yon, 1987–1988

Assignments
 541st Aircraft Control and Warning Group, 27 November 1950
 30th Air Division, 6 February 1952
 4706th Defense Wing, 16 February 1953
 37th Air Division, 8 July 1956
 30th Air Division, 1 April 1959
 Sault Sainte Marie Air Defense Sector, 1 April 1960
 Duluth Air Defense Sector, 1 October 1963
 29th Air Division, 1 April 1966
 23d Air Division, 19 November 1969
 24th Air Division, 1 Apr 1982 – 30 September 1988

See also
 List of United States Air Force aircraft control and warning squadrons
 United States general surveillance radar stations

References

Notes

Bibliography

 

Further reading
 Grant, C.L., (1961)  The Development of Continental Air Defense to 1 September 1954, USAF Historical Study No. 126

External links
 Information for Calumet AFS, MI

Installations of the United States Air Force in Michigan
Buildings and structures in Keweenaw County, Michigan
Military installations closed in 1988
Semi-Automatic Ground Environment sites
Aerospace Defense Command military installations
1951 establishments in Michigan
1988 disestablishments in Michigan
Military installations established in 1951